The Piastres affair, also known as Piastres scandal or Piastres trade (French: l'affaire des piastres, le scandale des piastres, or le trafic de piastres), was a financial-political scandal of the French Fourth Republic during the First Indochina War from 1950 to 1953. The basis for the affair was the pegging in 1945 of the French Indochinese piastre to the French franc at a rate of seventeen to one, increased from the previous rate of ten to one to avoid devaluation of the franc.

However the real value of the piastre in Indochina remained around 10 francs or less; when piastres were transferred to France through the Foreign Exchange Office (Office indochinois des changes, or OIC) the Treasury (therefore the French taxpayer) paid out the established seventeen francs per piastre, amounting to an effective subsidy of around 8.50 francs according to Jacques Despuech, author of the first book on the case in 1953 and journalist for The French Nation. Despite controls given to the OIC in 1948, the situation resulted in widespread money-laundering related to organized crime and political corruption.

The affair was brought to light in 1950 but aroused little interest among parliamentarians until 1952–3, when it was realized that the Viet Minh was also benefiting.

In July, 1954 the Geneva Accords were signed, ending French Indochina.

See also
French Indochinese piastre
Generals' Affair
Henri Martin Affair
First Indochina War
French political scandals
North Vietnamese đồng

References 
 Lucien Bodard, The Indochina War: The Stagnation, the Humiliation, the Adventure (La guerre d'Indochine. L'enlisement, l'humiliation, l'aventure), Grasset, 1500 p., Paris, 1997.
 Yves Gras, History of the Indochina War (Hirtoire de la guerre d'lndorhine), Plon, Paris, 1979.
 Paul Mus, Vietnam: Sociology of a War (Viêt-Nam, sociologie d'une guerre), Seuil, Paris, 1952.
 Jules Roy, The Battle of Dien Bien Phu, Julliard, 1963; Albin Michel, 1989.
 Despuech Jacques, The traffic of the Piastres, Two banks, 1953.
 Marianne, number of July 8, 2002.

Military history of France
Political scandals in France
French Fourth Republic
1950 in France
First Indochina War